The 2014 LPGA Championship was the 60th LPGA Championship, held August 14–17 at Monroe Golf Club in Pittsford, New York, a suburb southeast of Rochester. Known for sponsorship reasons as the Wegmans LPGA Championship, it was the fourth of five major championships on the LPGA Tour during the 2014 season. This was the first LPGA Championship played at Monroe Golf Club, after four years at nearby Locust Hill Country Club.

Defending champion Inbee Park won her second LPGA Championship, defeating runner-up Brittany Lincicome on the first hole of a sudden-death playoff for her fifth major title. Park was the first to win consecutive LPGA Championship titles in nine years, last accomplished by Annika Sörenstam, who won her third straight in 2005. Park's win the previous year at Locust Hill was also in a playoff.

This was the final year as the LPGA Championship, which became the "KPMG Women's PGA Championship" in 2015, conducted by the PGA of America.

Course

The course was designed by Donald Ross and opened  in 1924.

Source:

Field
The field included 150 players, including one amateur, from 28 countries.

Nationalities in the field

Past champions in the field

All nine former champions in the field made the 36-hole cut.

Round summaries

First round
Thursday, August 14, 2014

Second round
Friday, August 15, 2014

Third round
Saturday, August 16, 2014

Final round
Sunday, August 17, 2014

Source:

Scorecard
Final round

Cumulative tournament scores, relative to par
Source:

Playoff
The sudden-death playoff lasted one hole, played on the  par-4 18th hole. Both players missed the green with their approach shots and had chip shots. Lincicome missed her putt for par from six feet (1.8 m) while Park made her 3-footer (0.9 m) to win her second straight LPGA Championship.

Source:

References

External links

Coverage on LPGA official site
Monroe Golf Club: golf course

Women's PGA Championship
Golf in New York (state)
Sports competitions in New York (state)
LPGA Championship
LPGA Championship
LPGA Championship
LPGA Championship